Tathlith is a Saudi Arabian governorate located within 'Asir Province. , it had a population of 53,224 people, compared to 48,000 in 2004.

In 2018, Asir region governor Faisal bin Khalid bin Abdulaziz introduced a $373 million project to conduct water to Tathlith and Bisha governorates from Rub' al Khali.

References

Governorates of Saudi Arabia